Antti Everi (born 22 December 1981) is a Finnish weightlifter. Everi represented Finland at the 2008 Summer Olympics in Beijing, where he competed for the men's super heavyweight category (+105 kg). Everi placed eleventh in this event, as he successfully lifted 171 kg in the single-motion snatch, and hoisted 195 kg in the two-part, shoulder-to-overhead clean and jerk, for a total of 366 kg.

References

External links 
 Profile – Suomen Olympiakomitea 
 NBC Olympics Profile

1981 births
Living people
Finnish male weightlifters
Olympic weightlifters of Finland
Weightlifters at the 2008 Summer Olympics
Sportspeople from Huittinen
20th-century Finnish people
21st-century Finnish people